The Devil and Daniel Webster is a 1941 fantasy film based on the 1938 play adaptation of Stephen Vincent Benét's 1936 short story "The Devil and Daniel Webster". The play by Benét was in turn based on the libretto created by Benét for an opera adaptation of his short story with composer Douglas Moore, a project he began writing in 1937. Benét and Dan Totheroh adapted the play into the film's screenplay. The film's title was changed to All That Money Can Buy to avoid confusion with another film released by RKO that year, The Devil and Miss Jones, but later had the title restored on some prints. It has also been released under the titles Mr. Scratch, Daniel and the Devil and Here Is a Man. The film stars Edward Arnold, Walter Huston, James Craig, and Simone Simon.

Plot
In 1840 New Hampshire, Jabez Stone, a poor kindhearted farmer, is broke and plagued by bad luck. After a series of mishaps, he impulsively declares that he would sell his soul to the devil for two cents, and moments later, the devil appears, calling himself Mr. Scratch. He appears to offer Jabez a bargain: if he sells his soul, he will reap seven years of good luck and prosperity. Scratch tempts Jabez by magically revealing a hoard of Hessian gold coins, causing Jabez to sign the contract. He begins his new life with hope, paying off his debts and buying new tools and supplies. While the women are shopping, Jabez meets and becomes friends with the celebrated congressman, lawyer and orator Daniel Webster, a friend of his wife's family and a beloved figure who champions the cause of the poor farmers. Mr. Scratch is also tempting Webster to sell his soul in return for fulfilling his ambition to become president of the United States.

As time passes, Jabez's increasing wealth begins to change him. He ensnares his desperate neighbors with onerous financial contracts, slowly alienating his devoted wife, Mary, and his pious mother. Later, as the townspeople celebrate the harvest in Jabez's barn, Mary gives birth to their first child, whom they name Daniel in honor of Mr. Webster, but minutes later, Jabez discovers the local girl they had hired as a maid has vanished. In her place, he finds the beautiful and sinister Belle, who Mr. Scratch has sent. She bewitches Jabez, driving a wedge between Mary and himself. As Daniel grows, he too falls under Belle's influence, and she turns him into a spoiled, disobedient brat.

In a few more years, Jabez is one of the wealthiest men in the country. He has built a lavish mansion and throws a huge ball, but it ends in disaster. After a nightmarish dance between Belle and Miser Stephens (whose ruthless standards of debt repayment were a driving force in Jabez's decision to accept Scratch's offer), Jabez finds Stephens dead on the floor. He, too, had signed a pact with Mr. Scratch, and his time was up. Now desperate and realizing that his own time is almost up, Jabez tries to erase the deadline that Mr. Scratch burned into the tree outside the barn, but Scratch appears and again tempts Jabez, offering to extend his deal in return for the soul of his son. Horrified, Jabez flees and chases after Mary. He begs her forgiveness and pleads with Webster to help him find some way out of his bargain with the devil. Webster, the most renowned lawyer in the country, agrees to take his case. Mr. Scratch again offers an extension in exchange for Jabez's son, but Jabez declines. He then begs Webster to leave before it is too late, but Webster refuses to go.

When Mr. Scratch appears to claim his due, Webster must wager his own soul before his opponent will agree to a trial by jury. Mr. Scratch chooses the jury members from among the most notorious personalities of American history (including Benedict Arnold and Stede Bonnet), with John Hathorne (one of the magistrates of the Salem witch trials) as the judge. Webster begins by stating that he envies the jury because, as Americans, they were present at the birth of a nation, but they were fooled like Jabez Stone, trapped in their desire to rebel against their fate. Webster explains that it is the eternal right of everyone, including the jury, to raise their fists against their destinies. They took the wrong turn, just as Stone did, but Stone's soul can be saved.

Hathorne asks the jury for its verdict, and in response, the foreman tears up the contract, releasing Jabez from his deal. Webster then kicks out the now-powerless Mr. Scratch, but as he is ejected, the fiend promises that Webster will never fulfill his ambition to become president. Scratch, who has stolen a pie from the Stone kitchen window, sits alone eating it, resignedly thumbing through a notebook. He puts it away and then breaks the fourth wall, looking straight ahead and pointing wordlessly "You’re next" at the viewer.

Cast

Production
After the success of The Hunchback of Notre Dame (1939), William Dieterle founded his own production company and signed a contract with RKO Radio Pictures, the studio that had produced the film. He decided to adapt Stephen Vincent Benét's short story as the first film that he would make for the studio. Dieterle had appeared in F. W. Murnau's silent film Faust (1926).

The story had been adapted to the stage in 1939 at the Martin Beck Theater to great acclaim, but only ran for six performances because the production proved to be expensive. It was also later adapted as an opera that was performed during World War II by USO troupes.

Benét was invited to write the script for the film adaptation, along with Dan Totheroh, the younger brother of Roland Totheroh, who worked as Charlie Chaplin's top cinematographer from his silent short films to Monsieur Verdoux (1947). There were some differences between the short story and the film. In the original story, Webster regrets Benedict Arnold's absence; in the film, Arnold is present and Webster objects, citing him as a traitor and therefore not a true American, but his objection is dismissed by the judge, and Asa the Black Monk is made up for the film, along with John Smeet, who appears in a deleted scene. The writers also removed Scratch's other predictions involving Webster's last speech and his sons' deaths in the Civil War. Mr. Scratch, Walter Huston's character, is more soft-spoken in the story and the character of Belle, played by Simone Simon, appears in the film but not in the original story.

Thomas Mitchell was the original choice to play Daniel Webster, but he suffered a skull fracture while filming the carriage scene and was replaced by Edward Arnold.

Bernard Herrmann was chosen to compose the film, having composed music for Charles R. Jackson's 1938 radio adaptation that had aired on Columbia Workshop. Herrmann was introduced to the cast and crew by Dieterle, whom he found to be a very sophisticated director. In addition to his original music score, Herrmann also incorporated several traditional folk tunes, including "Devil's Dream", "Springfield Mountain" and a diabolical version of "Pop Goes The Weasel" played on the fiddle by Mr. Scratch. Herrmann collaborated with sound engineer James G. Stewart to ensure that the music and sound worked well together. To create the creepy sound heard when Mr. Scratch first appears in the barn, Herrmann sent a recording crew to San Fernando to record the sound of telephone wires. Hermann’s original music score won an Academy Award.

Alternative versions
The original release was 107 minutes long. It was a critical, but not a box-office, success, recording a loss of $53,000 on its initial run. It was later rereleased under the title The Devil and Daniel Webster, reducing the running time to 85 minutes with edits that were crudely done. The film was restored to its full length in the 1990s and has been issued in that form on home video formats, and the title has remained The Devil and Daniel Webster. The restored portions were sourced from inferior prints of the movie, but the quality has since improved. A preview print titled Here Is a Man was found in the estate of the director and served as the basis for the film's restoration and DVD release.

Parodies
The Simpsons featured a comedic spoof of The Devil and Daniel Webster in the 1993 episode "Treehouse of Horror IV". It was called The Devil and Homer Simpson and included a court case including "American betrayers", including the 1976 Philadelphia Flyers. The devil was played by Ned Flanders.

Awards and honors
Bernard Herrmann won the Academy Award for Best Music, Scoring of a Dramatic Picture and Walter Huston was nominated for Academy Award for Best Actor.

Preservation 
The Devil and Daniel Webster was preserved and restored by the UCLA Film and Television Archive. The restoration's funding was provided by the Hobson/Lucas Family Foundation in collaboration with Janus Films, the Museum of Modern Art and the Library of Congress. The restoration premiered at the UCLA Festival of Preservation in 2022 under the title All That Money Can Buy.

See also
 Politics in fiction
 Shortcut to Happiness, a 2003 modernised remake

References

External links

 
 
 
 
 
 The Devil and Daniel Webster, an essay by Bruce Eder at the Criterion Collection

1941 films
1940s fantasy films
RKO Pictures films
American black-and-white films
The Devil in film
Films directed by William Dieterle
Films scored by Bernard Herrmann
Films set in 1840
Films set in New Hampshire
Films that won the Best Original Score Academy Award
Films based on short fiction
Cultural depictions of Benedict Arnold
Cultural depictions of Blackbeard
Cultural depictions of William Kidd
Cultural depictions of Stede Bonnet
American dark fantasy films
American fantasy films
1940s American films
Film